Alexandr Borisovich Zinchenko (born 6 February 1995) is a Russian badminton player. Zinchenko started playing badminton at the Solntsevo Sports School in Moscow, at the age of eight. His mother took Zinchenko there, because she was fond of badminton and played as an amateur. He made a debut in the international senior tournament in 2012. In 2014, he won the Turkey International tournament partnered with Konstantin Abramov. In 2016, he won the Estonian International tournament in the mixed doubles event partnered with Olga Morozova. In 2017, he and Abramov won the Swedish International Series tournament.

Achievements

BWF World Tour 
The BWF World Tour, which was announced on 19 March 2017 and implemented in 2018, is a series of elite badminton tournaments sanctioned by the Badminton World Federation (BWF). The BWF World Tours are divided into levels of World Tour Finals, Super 1000, Super 750, Super 500, Super 300 (part of the HSBC World Tour), and the BWF Tour Super 100.

Men's doubles

BWF Grand Prix 
The BWF Grand Prix had two levels, the Grand Prix and Grand Prix Gold. It was a series of badminton tournaments sanctioned by the Badminton World Federation (BWF) and played between 2007 and 2017.

Men's doubles

BWF International Challenge/Series 
Men's doubles

Mixed doubles

  BWF International Challenge tournament
  BWF International Series tournament
  BWF Future Series tournament

References

External links 
 

1995 births
Living people
Badminton players from Moscow
Russian male badminton players
Russian people of Ukrainian descent